Occitanie may refer to:

Occitania, a region in southern France called Occitanie in French
Occitania (administrative region), the present-day French region, also called in French Occitanie